Echthistatus hawksi is a species of beetle in the family Cerambycidae. It was described by Giesbert in 2001. It is known from Honduras.

References

Parmenini
Beetles described in 2001